, also known as Crossways, Shadows of the Yoshiwara or Slums of Tokyo, is a 1928 silent Japanese drama film directed by Teinosuke Kinugasa. It is believed to be the first or one of the first Japanese films to be screened in Europe, and often mentioned in conjunction with Kinugasa's other avant-garde film, the two years earlier A Page of Madness.

Plot
A young man is obsessed with courtesan O-ume, but she refuses to meet him anymore, finding him too persistent. During a fight, the young man seemingly kills his rival, and is himself blinded. He hides in the flat which he shares with his sister, not knowing that the rival's death was only staged. A man approaches the sister, pretending to be a policeman who can help her to clear her brother from the charges with money. Also, a doctor whom the sister consults declares that her brother's eyes can be cured, but only if she can pay him. To collect the money, she offers herself as a prostitute to a procuress. When the alleged policeman attempts to rape the sister, she stabs him. Meanwhile, the brother has regained his eyesight on his own, goes to O-umes house and dies under her window, foaming from the mouth and ridiculed by O-ume and his rival. The last scene shows the sister standing at a crossway, calling in vain for her brother.

Cast
 Akiko Chihaya as the sister
 Toshinosuke Bando as the brother
 Yukiko Ogawa as O-ume, the courtesan
 Minoru Takase as the policeman (as Ippei Sōma)
 Misao Seki as the landlord
 Yoshie Nakagawa as the procuress
 Kazuo Hasegawa as the wrong woman
 Keinosuke Sawada as the rival (as Myoichiro Ozawa)

Release history
Crossroads was released in Japan on 11 May 1928. It was first screened in London on 26 January 1930 as Crossways and shown in New York in July of the same year as Slums of Tokyo. While favorably received by critics in Berlin and Paris, the New York Times critic stated, the film "possesses the virtue of sincerity but its tempo is too heavy". In later years, film historians repeatedly commented on the influence of the German expressionist film on Crossroads, in particular the works of Fritz Lang.

References

External links
 
 

1928 films
1928 drama films
Japanese silent films
Japanese drama films
Japanese black-and-white films
Japanese avant-garde and experimental films
Films set in Tokyo
Films directed by Teinosuke Kinugasa
Silent drama films